Chief of the Air Staff (CAS), Air Force Chief of Staff or Chief of Air Force, is the appointment held by the most senior officer in several nations' air forces. This appointment may refer to:

 Chief of Air Force (Australia)
 Chief of Air Staff (Bangladesh)
 Chief of the Air Force Staff (Canada)
 Chief of Staff of the French Air Force
 Chief of Air Staff (Ghana)
 Chief of the Air Staff (India)
 Chief of Staff of the Indonesian Air Force
 Chief of Air Force (New Zealand)
 Chief of the Air Staff (Nigeria)
 Chief of Air Staff (Pakistan)
 Chief of Staff of the Air Force (Spain)
 Chief of the Air Staff (Sweden)
 Chief of the Air Staff (United Kingdom)
 Chief of Staff of the United States Air Force

See also
 Air Staff (disambiguation)
 Chief of Air Force (disambiguation)
 Chief of Staff of the Air Force (disambiguation)
 Chief of Army Staff (disambiguation)
 Chief of the Defence Staff (disambiguation)
 Chief of the General Staff
 Chief of the Naval Staff (disambiguation)